The 2011 Booker Prize for Fiction was awarded at a ceremony on 18 October 2011. The Man Booker longlist of 13 books was announced on 26 July,  and was narrowed down to a shortlist of six on 6 September. The Prize was awarded  to Julian Barnes for The Sense of an Ending.

Judging panel
Dame Stella Rimington (Chair)
Matthew d’Ancona
Susan Hill
Chris Mullin
Gaby Wood

Nominees (shortlist)

Nominees (longlist)

References

Man Booker
Booker Prizes by year
2011 awards in the United Kingdom